Meatloaf is a dish of ground meat that has been combined with other ingredients and formed into the shape of a loaf, then baked or smoked. The final shape is either hand-formed on a baking tray, or pan-formed by cooking it in a loaf pan.  It is usually made with ground beef, although ground lamb, pork, veal, venison, poultry, and seafood are also used, sometimes in combination. Vegetarian adaptations of meatloaf may use imitation meat or pulses.

The cooked meatloaf can be sliced like a loaf of bread to make individual portions. It can easily become dry; therefore, various techniques exist to keep the dish moist, like mixing in bread crumbs and egg, covering it with sauce, wrapping it, or using moisture-enhancing ingredients in the mixture, such as filling it with fatty meats, rich cheeses, or vegetables.

History 
Meatloaf of minced meat was mentioned in the Roman cookery collection Apicius as early as the 5th century. Meatloaf is a traditional German, Scandinavian and Belgian dish, and it is a cousin to the Dutch meatball.

American meatloaf has its origins in scrapple, a mixture of ground pork and cornmeal served by German-Americans in Pennsylvania since colonial times. Meatloaf in the contemporary American sense did not appear in cookbooks until the late 19th century.

National variations

Austria 
The Austrian version of meatloaf is called faschierter Braten (literally "minced roast", from faschieren, "to mince", and ein Braten, "a roast"), also known as falscher Hase, or 'fake rabbit'. Most of the time, it is not filled (as it may be in Germany), though the variation im Speckmantel involves wrapping the exterior in ham or bacon before baking. Often, it is served with mashed potatoes (when warm), or with Cumberland sauce (when cold).

Bangladesh 
The Bangladeshi version of meatloaf is called Maṅśer lof.

Belgium 
The Belgian version of meatloaf is called vleesbrood (meatbread); however, fricandon is also used to refer to it in Dutch. In French, it is called pain de viande. It is usually served warm and can then be served with various sauces, but can also be eaten cold with a loaf of bread.

Bulgaria 
Rulo Stefani. The Bulgarian rulo Stefani meatloaf is similar to the Hungarian Stefánia meatloaf, with hard-boiled eggs, and sometimes with chopped carrots and pickled gherkins in the middle.

Chile 
Chilean meatloaf, known as Asado Aleman (German roasted meat) is a staple of southern Chilean cuisine, especially in areas known for having been influenced by the arrival of German colonizers during the 18th and 19th century. The most common recipe nowadays consists of ground beef, carrots, sausages, boiled eggs and breadcrumbs, cooked in the oven and normally served with a side-dish of mashed potatoes or rice.

Cuba 
The Cuban version of meatloaf is called pulpeta. It is made with ground beef and ground ham, and stuffed with hard boiled eggs, and it is cooked on the stovetop. The dish was brought to public attention, albeit mistakenly referred to as a sausage, in the second episode of the third season of The Cosby Show, entitled "Food for Thought". However, due to Cuba’s strict laws regarding the purchasing of meat products, especially beef, meatloaf is not a common dish in Cuba.

Czech Republic 

In the Czech Republic, meatloaf is referred to as sekaná ('chopped'). It is optional to put hard boiled eggs, gherkins, or wienerwurst inside.

Denmark 
Danish meatloaf is called forloren hare ('mock hare') or farsbrød ('ground-meat bread') and is usually made from a mixture of ground pork and beef with strips of bacon or cubed bacon on top. It is served with boiled or mashed potatoes and brown gravy sweetened with red currant jam.

Finland 
Finnish meatloaf is called lihamureke. It is entirely based on the basic meatball recipe. The only spices used are salt and pepper. It is not customary to stuff lihamureke with anything. The usual side dish is mashed potatoes, and lihamureke is usually served with brown sauce.

Germany 
In Germany, meatloaf is referred to as Hackbraten (literally "ground roast", from Hackfleisch, "ground meat", and ein Braten, "a roast"), faschierter Braten (literally "minced roast", from faschieren, "to mince", and ein Braten, "a roast"), Wiegebraten, falscher Hase ("false hare" or "faux hare") and Heuchelhase ("mock-hare"). In some regions, it often has boiled eggs inside.

Fleischlaib does literally mean "meat-loaf", but is actually another name for Leberkäse (literally "liver-cheese"), which is not a meatloaf.

Greece 
In Greece, meatloaf is referred to as rolo (Ρολό) and it is usually filled with hard boiled eggs, although several other variations exist.

Hungary 
Stefania meatloaf or Stefania slices are a type of Hungarian long meatloaf baked in a loaf pan, with 3 hard boiled eggs in the middle, making decorative white and yellow rings in the middle of the slices.

Italy 
In Italy, meatloaf is called polpettone and can be filled with eggs, ham and cheese, and other ingredients.

Jewish cuisine 
In Ashkenazi Jewish cuisine, meatloaf is called Klops and can be served cold or hot. It is sometimes filled with whole boiled eggs. The name presumably comes from the German Klops 'meatball'.

Lebanon 
In Lebanon, kibbeh (ground beef or lamb mixed with Bulgar) can sometimes be formed into a loaf and baked. It is sometimes made from raw meat.

North Macedonia 
Rolat is a similar dish to the chiefly Arab, though also Persian and South-Asian, kofta. Ground beef is rolled and cooked until brown. It can be cooked with vegetables and various sauces.

Mexico 
Meatloaf is known as albondigón and is small in size.

Mongolia 
Khuchmal is served with mashed potatoes cooked over the ground meat.

Netherlands 
The Dutch version of meatloaf is called gehaktbrood and can be eaten warm or cold. Slavink is sometimes thought of as a small meatloaf, though it is pan-fried.

Philippines 

Embutido (not to be confused with the Spanish embutido) is made of well-seasoned ground pork, raisins, minced carrots, sausages, and whole boiled eggs. The meat is molded into a roll with the sausages and hard boiled eggs set in the middle. Another variation of the dish involves wrapping the meatloaf with pork crow or mesentery. It is then wrapped in aluminum foil (historically, banana leaves) and steamed for an hour. The cooked embutido may be stored in freezers. It is usually served fried and sliced for breakfast.

Embutido is sometimes confused with morcón (also not to be confused with Spanish morcón), due to their similarity in appearance. However, morcón is a beef roulade, not a meatloaf.

Hardinera is a Filipino meatloaf made with diced or ground pork topped with sliced hard-boiled eggs, pineapples, carrots, bell peppers, peas, tomatoes, and raisins, among others.

Poland 
Called pieczeń rzymska ("Roman roast") or klops is made of ground pork, beef, onions and garlic, with an obligatory hard boiled egg inside.

Puerto Rico 
In Puerto Rican cuisine, meatloaf is known as albondigón or butifarrón al horno. Puerto Rican style meatloaf is made with ground pork, beef, turkey, adobo, Worcestershire sauce, milk, ketchup, potatoes, red beans, breadcrumbs, parsley, and a hard-boiled egg in the middle.

Romania 
In Romanian cuisine, there is a meatloaf dish called drob, similar to other minced meat dishes in the region like the Bulgarian Rulo Stefani or the Hungarian Stefánia meatloaf. The major difference is that drob is always made with lamb organs (or a mixture of lamb organs and pork or veal), and the hard boiled eggs in the centre of the drob are optional.

Sweden 
Swedish meatloaf is called köttfärslimpa (literally "minced meat-loaf", from köttfärs, "minced meat", and limpa, "loaf") and is usually made from a mixture of ground pork and beef. It is served with boiled or mashed potatoes, brown sauce gravy, often made from the meat juice that comes from cooking the meatloaf, and lingonberry jam. It is also used thinly sliced as a spread on sandwiches.

Turkey 

In Turkish cuisine, there is a version of meatloaf called dalyan köfte or rulo köfte; it is typically filled with carrots, peas, and whole boiled eggs.

United Kingdom 
In the UK, there are regional pork meatloaf dishes known as haslet, which can be eaten cold or hot.

United States & Canada 

During the Great Depression, cooking meatloaf was a way for families to stretch the food budget by using an inexpensive type of meat and left-over ingredients. Along with spices, it was popular to add cereal grains, bread or saltine crackers to the meatloaf to add bulk and stretch the meat. This tradition of additions still lives on, but with new goals: primarily, producing a lower-fat dish with superior binding and consistency.

American-style meatloaf is typically eaten with a sauce or relish, often applied before cooking. Many recipes call for a tomato sauce to be poured over the loaf, which forms a crust during baking. A simple brown or onion gravy or a can of cream of mushroom soup can substitute for tomato-based sauce, but the meatloaf is prepared in a similar manner. Barbecue sauce, tomato ketchup, or a mixture of ketchup and prepared mustard may also be used. This style of meatloaf may be topped with a "meatloaf sauce" consisting of ketchup and brown sugar.  Another variety of meatloaf, in the same style, is prepared by "frosting" the loaf with mashed potatoes, drizzling a small amount of butter over the top, and then browning it in the oven.

American-style meatloaf is normally served warm, as part of a main course, but it can also be sliced as a cold cut (and then used in sandwiches). This dish can be considered a typical comfort food in the US and Canada, and so it is served in many diners and restaurants. In a 2007 poll by Good Housekeeping, meatloaf was the seventh-favorite dish of Americans.

Vietnam 
The Vietnamese meatloaf version is called chả. It is boiled rather than baked or smoked. There are many versions of chả that differ in the ingredients used.

See also

References

External links 
 
 

Meat dishes
Cooking techniques
Baked foods
Roman cuisine
American cuisine
Belgian cuisine
German cuisine
Swedish cuisine
Finnish cuisine
Danish cuisine

Smoked meat
Ground meat